Dick Dorsey (born March 11, 1936) is a former American football wide receiver. He played for the Oakland Raiders in 1962.

References

1936 births
Living people
American football wide receivers
Oklahoma Sooners football players
USC Trojans football players
Oakland Raiders players